Fitzgerald, also known as Fort Fitzgerald and originally Smith's Landing, is an unincorporated community in northern Alberta, Canada within the Regional Municipality of Wood Buffalo, located  south of the Northwest Territories border, and  southeast of Fort Smith.

History

Prior to the extension of railway service to Hay River, Northwest Territories, on Great Slave Lake, all cargo being shipped to or from the north had to be portaged from Fitzgerald to Fort Smith, to avoid four impassable rapids. The community was known as Smith's Landing until 1915 when it was renamed Fort Fitzgerald after the late Francis Joseph Fitzgerald.

Services
Most of the community's services are provided from Fort Smith, including fire, law enforcement, health care, social services, and telecommunications. Law enforcement is part of the Royal Canadian Mounted Police 'G division' in the Northwest Territories. Since telecommunication services, including cellular and internet, are from Fort Smith, Northwest Territories, the area code is 867, although Fitzgerald is located in what would be area code 780 in Alberta.

An all-weather road, named Hay Camp Road, links Fort Smith and Hay Camp through Fitzgerald.

Demographics
Fitzgerald had a population of 8 people in the 2018 Regional Municipality of Wood Buffalo census. The population of the Thebathi 196 Indian Reserve in the federal 2016 census was 20, a 33.3% decrease from the 2011 census which had a population of 30.

Climate
Fitzgerald has a subarctic climate (Köppen climate classification Dfc). Summers are short and warm, and winters long and cold.

See also
List of communities in Alberta
List of unincorporated communities in Alberta

References

External links 
Regional Municipality of Wood Buffalo
Fort Fitzgerald

Localities on Indian reserves in Alberta
Localities in the Regional Municipality of Wood Buffalo